The causal sets program is an approach to quantum gravity. Its founding principles are that spacetime is fundamentally discrete (a collection of discrete spacetime points, called the elements of the causal set) and that spacetime events are related by a partial order. This partial order has the physical meaning of the causality relations between spacetime events.

The program is based on a theorem by David Malament that states that if there is a bijective map between two past and future distinguishing space times that preserves their causal structure then the map is a conformal isomorphism. The conformal factor that is left undetermined is related to the volume of regions in the spacetime. This volume factor can be recovered by specifying a volume element for each space time point. The volume of a space time region could then be found by counting the number of points in that region.

Causal sets was initiated by Rafael Sorkin who continues to be the main proponent of the program. He has coined the slogan "Order + Number = Geometry" to characterize the above argument. The program provides a theory in which space time is fundamentally discrete while retaining local Lorentz invariance.

Definition 
A causal set (or causet) is a set  with a partial order relation  that is
 Reflexive: For all , we have .
 Antisymmetric: For all , we have  and  implies .
 Transitive: For all , we have  and  implies .
 Locally finite: For all , we have  is a finite set.

The set  represents the set of spacetime events and the order relation  represents the causal relationship between events (see causal structure for the analogous idea in a Lorentzian manifold).

Although this definition uses the reflexive convention we could have chosen the irreflexive convention in which the order relation is irreflexive and asymmetric. 

The causal relation of a Lorentzian manifold (without closed causal curves) satisfies the first three conditions. It is the local finiteness condition that introduces spacetime discreteness.

Comparison to the continuum 

Given a causal set we may ask whether it can be embedded into a Lorentzian manifold. An embedding would be a map taking elements of the causal set into points in the manifold such that the order relation of the causal set matches the causal ordering of the manifold. A further criterion is needed however before the embedding is suitable. If, on average, the number of causal set elements mapped into a region of the manifold is proportional to the volume of the region then the embedding is said to be faithful. In this case we can consider the causal set to be 'manifold-like'.

A central conjecture of the causal set program, called the Hauptvermutung ('fundamental conjecture'), now refuted, is that the same causal set cannot be faithfully embedded into two spacetimes that are not similar on large scales.

It is difficult to define this conjecture precisely because it is difficult to decide when two spacetimes are 'similar on large scales'.

Modelling spacetime as a causal set would require us to restrict attention to those causal sets that are 'manifold-like'. Given a causal set this is a difficult property to determine.

Regardless, the Hauptvermutung has now been shown to be false.

Sprinkling 

The difficulty of determining whether a causal set can be embedded into a manifold can be approached from the other direction. We can create a causal set by sprinkling points into a Lorentzian manifold. By sprinkling points in proportion to the volume of the spacetime regions and using the causal order relations in the manifold to induce order relations between the sprinkled points, we can produce a causal set that (by construction) can be faithfully embedded into the manifold.

To maintain Lorentz invariance this sprinkling of points must be done randomly using a Poisson process. Thus the probability of sprinkling  points into a region of volume  is

where  is the density of the sprinkling.

Sprinkling points as a regular lattice would not keep the number of points proportional to the region volume.

Geometry 

Some geometrical constructions in manifolds carry over to causal sets. When defining these we must remember to rely only on the causal set itself, not on any background spacetime into which it might be embedded. For an overview of these constructions, see.

Geodesics 

A link in a causal set is a pair of elements  such that  but with no  such that .

If every  in the chain form a link, then the chain is called a path.

We can use this to define the notion of a geodesic between two causal set elements, provided they are order comparable, that is, causally connected (physically, this means they are time-like).  A geodesic between two elements  is a chain consisting only of links such that
  and 
In general there can be more than one geodesic between two comparable elements.

Myrheim first suggested that the length of such a geodesic should be directly proportional to the proper time along a timelike geodesic joining the two spacetime points. Tests of this conjecture have been made using causal sets generated from sprinklings into flat spacetimes. The proportionality has been shown to hold and is conjectured to hold for sprinklings in curved spacetimes too.

Dimension estimators 

Much work has been done in estimating the manifold dimension of a causal set. This involves algorithms using the causal set aiming to give the dimension of the manifold into which it can be faithfully embedded. The algorithms developed so far are based on finding the dimension of a Minkowski spacetime into which the causal set can be faithfully embedded.

Myrheim–Meyer dimension
This approach relies on estimating the number of -length chains present in a sprinkling into -dimensional Minkowski spacetime.

Midpoint-scaling dimension
This approach relies on the relationship between the proper time between two points in Minkowski spacetime and the volume of the spacetime interval between them.

These estimators should give the correct dimension for causal sets generated by high-density sprinklings into -dimensional Minkowski spacetime. Tests in conformally-flat spacetimes have shown these two methods to be accurate.

Dynamics 

An ongoing task is to develop the correct dynamics for causal sets. These would provide a set of rules that determine which causal sets correspond to physically realistic spacetimes. The most popular approach to developing causal set dynamics is based on the sum-over-histories version of quantum mechanics. This approach would perform a "sum-over-causal sets" by growing a causal set one element at a time. Elements would be added according to quantum mechanical rules and interference would ensure a large manifold-like spacetime would dominate the contributions. The best model for dynamics at the moment is a classical model in which elements are added according to probabilities. This model, due to David Rideout and Rafael Sorkin, is known as classical sequential growth (CSG) dynamics. The classical sequential growth model is a way to generate causal sets by adding new elements one after another. Rules for how new elements are added are specified and, depending on the parameters in the model, different causal sets result.

In analogy to the path integral formulation of quantum mechanics, one approach to developing a quantum dynamics for causal sets has been to apply an action principle in the sum-over-causal sets approach. Sorkin has proposed a discrete analogue for the d'Alembertian, which can in turn be used to define the Ricci curvature scalar and thereby the Benincasa–Dowker action on a causal set. Monte-Carlo simulations have provided evidence for a continuum phase in 2D using the Benincasa–Dowker action.

See also 

 Causal dynamical triangulation (CDT)
 Causal structure
 General relativity
 Order theory

References

Further reading 

Introduction and reviews
L. Bombelli.  Causal Set reference page (Overview)
L. Bombelli. Causal Sets: Overview and Status,  Talk given at Quantum Gravity in the Americas III, August 24–26, 2006;  (Introduction, Overview)
F. Dowker,  Causal sets and the deep structure of spacetime, arXiv:gr-qc/0508109; (Introduction)
F. Dowker, Causal sets as discrete spacetime, Contemporary Physics, vol. 47, Issue 1, p. 1-9; (Overview, Introduction)
F. Dowker, Introduction to causal sets and their phenomenology, Gen Relativ Gravit (2013) 45:1651–1667 doi:10.1007/s10714-013-1569-y (Overview of recent research)
J. Henson, The causal set approach to quantum gravity, arXiv:gr-qc/0601121; (Introduction, Overview)
D.D. Reid; Introduction to causal sets: an alternate view of spacetime structure; Canadian Journal of Physics 79, 1-16 (2001); arXiv:gr-qc/9909075; (General);
R.D. Sorkin; Causal set glossary and bibliography (20 November 2001); (Glossary and bibliography);
R.D. Sorkin, Causal Sets: Discrete Gravity (Notes for the Valdivia Summer School), In Proceedings of the Valdivia Summer School, edited by A. Gomberoff and D. Marolf; arXiv:gr-qc/0309009; (Introduction, Glossary)

Foundations
L. Bombelli, J. Lee, D. Meyer, R.D. Sorkin, Spacetime as a causal set, Phys. Rev. Lett. 59:521-524 (1987) ; (Introduction, Foundations)
C. Moore, Comment on "Space-time as a causal set",   Phys. Rev. Lett. 60, 655 (1988); (Foundations)
L. Bombelli, J. Lee, D. Meyer, R.D. Sorkin, Bombelli et al. Reply,  Phys. Rev. Lett. 60, 656 (1988); (Foundations)
A. Einstein,  Letter to H.S. Joachim, August 14, 1954; Item 13-453 cited in J. Stachel,“Einstein and the Quantum: Fifty Years of Struggle”, in From Quarks to Quasars, Philosophical Problems of Modern Physics, edited by R.G. Colodny (U. Pittsburgh Press, 1986), pages 380-381; (Historical)
D. Finkelstein, Space-time code, Phys. Rev. 184:1261 (1969); (Foundations)
D. Finkelstein, "Superconducting" Causal Nets,  Int. J. Th. Phys 27:473(1988);  (Foundations)
G. Hemion, A quantum theory of space and time; Found. Phys. 10 (1980), p. 819 (Similar proposal)
J. Myrheim, Statistical geometry, CERN preprint TH-2538 (1978); (Foundations, Historical)
B. Riemann, Über die Hypothesen, welche der Geometrie zu Grunde liegen, The Collected Works of B. Riemann (Dover NY 1953); ; (Historical)
R.D. Sorkin; A Finitary Substitute for Continuous Topology,  Int. J. Theor. Phys. 30 7: 923-947 (1991); (Foundational)
R.D. Sorkin, Does a Discrete Order underly Spacetime and its Metric?,  Proceedings of the Third Canadian Conference on General Relativity and Relativistic Astrophysics, (Victoria, Canada, May, 1989), edited by A. Coley, F. Cooperstock, B.Tupper, pp. 82–86, (World Scientific, 1990); (Introduction)
R.D. Sorkin, First Steps with Causal Sets ,  General Relativity and Gravitational Physics, (Proceedings of the Ninth Italian Conference of the same name, held Capri, Italy, September, 1990), 68-90, (World Scientific, Singapore), (1991), R. Cianci, R. de Ritis, M. Francaviglia, G. Marmo, C. Rubano, P. Scudellaro (eds.);  (Introduction)
R.D. Sorkin, Spacetime and Causal Sets ,  Relativity and Gravitation: Classical and Quantum, (Proceedings of the SILARG VII Conference, held Cocoyoc, Mexico, December, 1990), pages 150-173, (World Scientific, Singapore, 1991), J.C. D’Olivo, E. Nahmad-Achar, M.Rosenbaum, M.P. Ryan, L.F. Urrutia and F. Zertuche (eds.);  (Introduction)
R.D. Sorkin, Forks in the Road, on the Way to Quantum Gravity,  Talk given at the conference entitled “Directions in General Relativity”, held at College Park, Maryland, May, 1993, Int. J. Th. Phys. 36: 2759–2781 (1997); arXiv:gr-qc/9706002; (Philosophical, Introduction)
G.'t Hooft, Quantum gravity: a fundamental problem and some radical ideas,  Recent Developments in Gravitation (Proceedings of the 1978 Cargese Summer Institute) edited by M. Levy and S. Deser (Plenum, 1979); (Introduction, Foundations, Historical)
E.C. Zeeman, Causality Implies the Lorentz Group,  J. Math. Phys. 5: 490-493; (Historical, Foundations)

PhD theses
L. Bombelli, Space-time as a Causal Set, PhD thesis (Syracuse University, 1987); (Introduction, Kinematics)
A.R. Daughton; The Recovery of Locality for Causal Sets and Related Topics; PhD thesis (Syracuse University, 1993); (Locality)
D. Dou, Causal Sets, a Possible Interpretation for the Black Hole Entropy, and Related Topics;  PhD thesis (SISSA, Trieste, 1999); arXiv:gr-qc/0106024 (Black hole entropy)
S. Johnston, Quantum Fields on Causal Sets, PhD Thesis (Imperial College London, 2010) arXiv:1010.5514 (Quantum Field Theory)
D.A. Meyer, The Dimension of Causal Sets,  PhD thesis (M.I.T., 1988);  (Dimension theory)
L. Philpott, Causal Set Phenomenology, PhD Thesis (Imperial College London, 2010); arXiv:1009.1593 (Swerves, Phenomenology)
D.P. Rideout; Dynamics of Causal Sets; PhD Thesis (Syracuse University 2001); arXiv:gr-qc/0212064; (Cosmology, Dynamics)
R.B. Salgado; Toward a Quantum Dynamics for Causal Sets; PhD Thesis (Syracuse University 2008); (Scalar field theory, Quantum Measure Theory)
R. Sverdlov; Quantum Field Theory and Gravity in Causal Sets; PhD Thesis (University of Michigan 2009); arXiv: 0905.2263 (Quantum Field Theory and Gravity)

Talks
Joe Henson, An Invitation to Causal Sets; Talk given at Perimeter Institute, 14 September 2010, Waterloo ON (Introduction)
F. Dowker, Causal Set Phenomenology; Talk given at Loops 05, 10–14 October 2005, Potsdam, Max Planck Institute for Gravitational Physics (Swerves)
S. Johnston; Particle Propagators from Discrete Spacetime; Talk given at Perimeter Institute 14 April 2008 (Quantum field theory)
D.A. Meyer; Talk given at the 1997 Santa Fe workshop: Causal Sets and Feynman diagrams; Presented at "New Directions in Simplicial Quantum Gravity" July 28 - August 8, 1997; (Feynman diagrams, Quantum Dynamics)
D.P. Rideout; Spatial Hypersurfaces in Causal Set Cosmology; Talk given at  Loops 05, 10–14 October 2005, Potsdam, Max Planck Institute for Gravitational Physics (Spatial hyper-surfaces, Dynamics)
J. Scargle, Testing Quantum Gravity Theories with GLAST; Talk given at Santa Cruz Institute for Particle Physics, April 24, 2007. (Lorentz invariance, Phenomenology)
R.D. Sorkin; Two Talks given at the 1997 Santa Fe workshop: A Review of the Causal Set Approach to Quantum Gravity and ''; Presented at ”New Directions in Simplicial Quantum Gravity” July 28 - August 8, 1997; ;;
R.D. Sorkin; Does quantum gravity give rise to an observable nonlocality?; Talk given at Perimeter Institute 17/01/2007 (d'Alembertian, Locality)
R.D. Sorkin, Some Insights for Quantum Gravity Derived from Work on Causal Sets; Talk given at  Loops 05, 10–14 October 2005, Potsdam, Max Planck Institute for Gravitational Physics (Overview)
R.D. Sorkin Is a past-finite causal order the inner basis of spacetime? Talk given at Perimeter Institute 07/09/2005
S. Surya, Recovering spacetime topology from a causet; Talk given at  Loops 05, 10–14 October 2005, Potsdam, Max Planck Institute for Gravitational Physics (Topology)
R. Sverdlov; Introduction of bosonic fields into causal set theory; Talk given at Perimeter Institute 19/02/2008 (Quantum field theory)

Manifoldness
L. Bombelli, D.A. Meyer; The origin of Lorentzian geometry; Phys. Lett. A 141:226-228 (1989);  (Manifoldness)
L. Bombelli, R.D. Sorkin, When are Two Lorentzian Metrics close?, General Relativity and Gravitation, proceedings of the 12th International Conference on General Relativity and Gravitation, held July 2–8, 1989, in Boulder, Colorado, USA, under the auspices of the International Society on General Relativity and Gravitation, 1989, p. 220; (Closeness of Lorentzian manifolds)
L. Bombelli, Causal sets and the closeness of Lorentzian manifolds, Relativity in General: proceedings of the Relativity Meeting "93, held September 7–10, 1993, in Salas, Asturias, Spain. Edited by J. Diaz Alonso, M. Lorente Paramo. . Published by Editions Frontieres, 91192 Gif-sur-Yvette Cedex, France, 1994, p. 249; (Closeness of Lorentzian manifolds)
L. Bombelli, Statistical Lorentzian geometry and the closeness of Lorentzian manifolds, J. Math. Phys.41:6944-6958 (2000); arXiv:gr-qc/0002053  (Closeness of Lorentzian manifolds, Manifoldness)
A.R. Daughton, An investigation of the symmetric case of when causal sets can embed into manifolds,  Class. Quantum Grav.15(11):3427-3434 (Nov., 1998) (Manifoldness)
J. Henson, Constructing an interval of Minkowski space from a causal set,  Class. Quantum Grav. 23 (2006) L29-L35; arXiv:gr-qc/0601069; (Continuum limit, Sprinkling)
S. Major, D.P. Rideout, S. Surya, On Recovering Continuum Topology from a Causal Set, J.Math.Phys.48:032501,2007; arXiv:gr-qc/0604124 (Continuum Topology)
S. Major, D.P. Rideout, S. Surya; Spatial Hypersurfaces in Causal Set Cosmology; Class. Quantum Grav. 23 (2006) 4743-4752; arXiv:gr-qc/0506133v2; (Observables, Continuum topology)
S. Major, D.P. Rideout, S. Surya, Stable Homology as an Indicator of Manifoldlikeness in Causal Set Theory, arXiv:0902.0434 (Continuum topology and homology)
D.A. Meyer, The Dimension of Causal Sets I: Minkowski dimension, Syracuse University preprint (1988); (Dimension theory)
D.A. Meyer, The Dimension of Causal Sets II: Hausdorff dimension, Syracuse University preprint (1988); (Dimension theory)
D.A. Meyer, Spherical containment and the Minkowski dimension of partial orders,  Order 10: 227-237 (1993); (Dimension theory)
J. Noldus, A new topology on the space of Lorentzian metrics on a fixed manifold,   Class. Quant. Grav 19: 6075-6107 (2002); (Closeness of Lorentzian manifolds)
J. Noldus, A Lorentzian Gromov–Hausdorff notion of distance, Class. Quantum Grav. 21, 839-850, (2004);  (Closeness of Lorentzian manifolds)
D.D. Reid, Manifold dimension of a causal set: Tests in conformally flat spacetimes,  Phys. Rev. D67 (2003) 024034; arXiv:gr-qc/0207103v2 (Dimension theory)
S. Surya, Causal Set Topology; arXiv:0712.1648

Geometry
E. Bachmat; Discrete spacetime and its applications; arXiv:gr-qc/0702140; (Geodesics, Antichains)
G. Brightwell, R. Gregory; The Structure of Random Discrete Spacetime; Phys. Rev. Lett. 66:260-263 (1991);  (Geodesic Length)
G. W. Gibbons, S. N. Solodukhin; The Geometry of Small Causal Diamonds arXiv:hep-th/0703098 (Causal intervals)
S.W. Hawking, A.R. King, P.J. McCarthy; A new topology for curved space–time which incorporates the causal, differential, and conformal structures; J. Math. Phys. 17 2:174-181 (1976);  (Geometry, Causal Structure)
S. He, D.P. Rideout; A Causal Set Black Hole; arXiv:0811.4235 (Causal structure of Schwarzschild spacetime, Sprinklings)
R. Ilie, G.B. Thompson, D.D. Reid; A numerical study of the correspondence between paths in a causal set and geodesics in the continuum; 2006 Class. Quantum Grav. 23 3275-3285 arXiv:gr-qc/0512073(Geodesic length)
A.V. Levichev; Prescribing the conformal geometry of a lorentz manifold by means of its causal structure; Soviet Math. Dokl. 35:452-455, (1987); (Geometry, Causal Structure)

D.P. Rideout, P. Wallden; Spacelike distance from discrete causal order; arXiv:0810.1768 (Spatial distances)

Cosmological constant prediction
M. Ahmed, S. Dodelson, P.B. Greene, R.D. Sorkin,  Everpresent lambda;  Phys. Rev. D69, 103523, (2004) arXiv:astro-ph/0209274v1 ;   (Cosmological Constant)
Y. Jack Ng and H. van Dam, A small but nonzero cosmological constant;  Int. J. Mod. Phys D. 10 : 49 (2001) arXiv:hep-th/9911102v3; (PreObservation Cosmological Constant)
Y. Kuznetsov, On cosmological constant in Causal Set theory; arXiv:0706.0041
R.D. Sorkin, A Modified Sum-Over-Histories for Gravity; reported in Highlights in gravitation and cosmology: Proceedings of the International Conference on Gravitation and Cosmology, Goa, India, 14–19 December 1987, edited by B. R. Iyer, Ajit Kembhavi, Jayant V. Narlikar, and C. V. Vishveshwara, see pages 184-186 in the article by D. Brill and L. Smolin: “Workshop on quantum gravity and new directions”, pp  183–191 (Cambridge University Press, Cambridge, 1988); (PreObservation Cosmological Constant)
R.D. Sorkin; On the Role of Time in the Sum-over-histories Framework for Gravity, paper presented to the conference on The History of Modern Gauge Theories, held Logan, Utah, July 1987; Int. J. Theor. Phys. 33 : 523-534 (1994); (PreObservation Cosmological Constant)
R.D. Sorkin, First Steps with Causal Sets , in R. Cianci, R. de Ritis, M. Francaviglia, G. Marmo, C. Rubano, P. Scudellaro (eds.), General Relativity and Gravitational Physics (Proceedings of the Ninth Italian Conference of the same name, held Capri, Italy, September, 1990), pp. 68–90 (World Scientific, Singapore, 1991); (PreObservation Cosmological Constant)
R.D. Sorkin; Forks in the Road, on the Way to Quantum Gravity, talk given at the conference entitled “Directions in General Relativity”, held at College Park, Maryland,  May, 1993; Int. J. Th. Phys. 36 : 2759–2781 (1997) arXiv:gr-qc/9706002 ; (PreObservation Cosmological Constant)
R.D. Sorkin, Discrete Gravity;  a series of lectures to the First Workshop on Mathematical Physics and Gravitation, held Oaxtepec, Mexico, Dec. 1995 (unpublished); (PreObservation Cosmological Constant)
R.D. Sorkin, Big extra dimensions make Lambda too small; arXiv:gr-qc/0503057v1;  (Cosmological Constant)
R.D. Sorkin,  Is the cosmological "constant" a nonlocal quantum residue of discreteness of the causal set type?; Proceedings of the PASCOS-07 Conference, July 2007, Imperial College London; arXiv:0710.1675; (Cosmological Constant)
J. Zuntz, The CMB in a Causal Set Universe, arXiv:0711.2904 (CMB)

Lorentz and Poincaré invariance, phenomenology
L. Bombelli, J. Henson, R.D. Sorkin; Discreteness without symmetry breaking: a theorem;   arXiv:gr-qc/0605006v1; (Lorentz invariance, Sprinkling)
F. Dowker, J. Henson, R.D. Sorkin, Quantum gravity phenomenology, Lorentz invariance and discreteness; Mod. Phys. Lett. A19, 1829–1840, (2004) arXiv:gr-qc/0311055v3; (Lorentz invariance, Phenomenology, Swerves)
F. Dowker, J. Henson, R.D. Sorkin, Discreteness and the transmission of light from distant sources;  arXiv:1009.3058 (Coherence of light, Phenomenology)
J. Henson, Macroscopic observables and Lorentz violation in discrete quantum gravity; arXiv:gr-qc/0604040v1; (Lorentz invariance, Phenomenology)
N. Kaloper, D. Mattingly, Low energy bounds on Poincaré violation in causal set theory; Phys. Rev. D 74, 106001 (2006) arXiv:astro-ph/0607485 (Poincaré invariance, Phenomenology)
D. Mattingly, Causal sets and conservation laws in tests of Lorentz symmetry; Phys. Rev. D 77, 125021 (2008) arXiv:0709.0539 (Lorentz invariance, Phenomenology)
L. Philpott, F. Dowker, R.D. Sorkin, Energy-momentum diffusion from spacetime discreteness; arXiv:0810.5591 (Phenomenology, Swerves)

Black hole entropy in causal set theory
D. Dou, Black Hole Entropy as Causal Links;  Fnd. of Phys, 33 2:279-296(18) (2003); arXiv:gr-qc/0302009v1  (Black hole entropy)
D.P. Rideout, S. Zohren, Counting entropy in causal set quantum gravity ; arXiv:gr-qc/0612074v1; (Black hole entropy)
D.P. Rideout, S. Zohren, Evidence for an entropy bound from fundamentally discrete gravity;  Class. Quantum Grav. 23 (2006) 6195-6213; arXiv:gr-qc/0606065v2 (Black hole entropy)

Locality and quantum field theory
G. Hemion, A discrete geometry: speculations on a new framework for classical electrodynamics; Int. J. Theor. Phys. 27 (1988), p. 1145 (Classical electrodynamics)
S. Johnston; Particle propagators on discrete spacetime; 2008 Class. Quantum Grav. 25 202001; arXiv:0806.3083 (Quantum Field Theory)
S. Johnston; The Feynman propagator for a Free Scalar Field on a Causal Set; Phys. Rev. Lett. 103, 180401 (2009); arXiv:0909.0944 (Quantum Field Theory)
R.D. Sorkin; Does Locality Fail at Intermediate Length-Scales; Towards Quantum Gravity, Daniele Oriti (ed.) (Cambridge University Press, 2007); arXiv:gr-qc/0703099v1; (d'Alembertian, Locality)
R. Sverdlov, L. Bombelli; Gravity and Matter in Causal Set Theory; arXiv:0801.0240
R. Sverdlov; A Geometrical Description of Spinor Fields; arXiv:0802.1914
R. Sverdlov; Bosonic Fields in Causal Set Theory; arXiv:0807.4709
R. Sverdlov; Gauge Fields in Causal Set Theory; arXiv:0807.2066
R. Sverdlov; Spinor fields in Causal Set Theory; arXiv:0808.2956

Causal set dynamics
M. Ahmed, D. Rideout, Indications of de Sitter Spacetime from Classical Sequential Growth Dynamics of Causal Sets; arXiv:0909.4771
A.Ash, P. McDonald, Moment Problems and the Causal Set Approach to Quantum Gravity; J.Math.Phys. 44 (2003) 1666-1678; arXiv:gr-qc/0209020
A.Ash, P. McDonald, Random partial orders, posts, and the causal set approach to discrete quantum gravity; J.Math.Phys. 46 (2005) 062502 (Analysis of number of posts in growth processes)
D.M.T. Benincasa, F. Dowker, The Scalar Curvature of a Causal Set; arXiv:1001.2725; (Scalar curvature, actions)
G. Brightwell; M. Luczak; Order-invariant Measures on Causal Sets; arXiv:0901.0240; (Measures on causal sets)
G. Brightwell; M. Luczak; Order-invariant Measures on Fixed Causal Sets; arXiv:0901.0242; (Measures on causal sets)
G. Brightwell, H.F. Dowker, R.S. Garcia, J. Henson, R.D. Sorkin; General covariance and the "problem of time" in a discrete cosmology; In ed. K. Bowden, Correlations:Proceedings of the ANPA 23 conference, August 16–21, 2001, Cambridge, England, pp. 1–17. Alternative Natural Philosophy Association, (2002).;arXiv:gr-qc/0202097; (Cosmology, Dynamics, Observables)
G. Brightwell, H.F. Dowker, R.S. Garcia, J. Henson, R.D. Sorkin; "Observables" in causal set cosmology; Phys. Rev. D67, 084031, (2003); arXiv:gr-qc/0210061;  (Cosmology, Dynamics, Observables)
G. Brightwell, J. Henson, S. Surya; A 2D model of Causal Set Quantum Gravity: The emergence of the continuum; arXiv:0706.0375; (Quantum Dynamics, Toy Model)
G.Brightwell, N. Georgiou; Continuum limits for classical sequential growth models University of Bristol preprint. (Dynamics)
A. Criscuolo, H. Waelbroeck; Causal Set Dynamics: A Toy Model; Class. Quantum Grav.16:1817-1832 (1999); arXiv:gr-qc/9811088; (Quantum Dynamics, Toy Model)
F. Dowker, S. Surya; Observables in extended percolation models of causal set cosmology;Class. Quantum Grav. 23, 1381-1390 (2006); arXiv:gr-qc/0504069v1; (Cosmology, Dynamics,  Observables)
M. Droste, Universal homogeneous causal sets, J. Math. Phys. 46, 122503 (2005); arXiv:gr-qc/0510118; (Past-finite causal sets)
J. Henson, D. Rideout, R.D. Sorkin, S. Surya; Onset of the Asymptotic Regime for (Uniformly Random) Finite Orders; Experimental Mathematics 26, 3:253-266 (2017); (Cosmology, Dynamics)
A.L. Krugly; Causal Set Dynamics and Elementary Particles; Int. J. Theo. Phys 41 1:1-37(2004);; (Quantum Dynamics)
X. Martin, D. O'Connor, D.P. Rideout, R.D. Sorkin; On the “renormalization” transformations induced by cycles of expansion and contraction in causal set cosmology; Phys. Rev. D 63, 084026 (2001); arXiv:gr-qc/0009063 (Cosmology, Dynamics)
D.A. Meyer; Spacetime Ising models; (UCSD preprint May 1993); (Quantum Dynamics)
D.A. Meyer; Why do clocks tick?; General Relativity and Gravitation 25 9:893-900;; (Quantum Dynamics)
I. Raptis; Quantum Space-Time as a Quantum Causal Set, arXiv:gr-qc/0201004v8
D.P. Rideout, R.D. Sorkin; A classical sequential growth dynamics for causal sets, Phys. Rev. D, 6, 024002 (2000);arXiv:gr-qc/9904062 (Cosmology, Dynamics)
D.P. Rideout, R.D. Sorkin; Evidence for a continuum limit in causal set dynamics  Phys. Rev. D 63:104011,2001; arXiv:gr-qc/0003117(Cosmology, Dynamics)
R.D. Sorkin; Indications of causal set cosmology; Int. J. Theor. Ph. 39(7):1731-1736 (2000); arXiv:gr-qc/0003043; (Cosmology, Dynamics)
R.D. Sorkin; Relativity theory does not imply that the future already exists: a counterexample; Relativity and the Dimensionality of the World, Vesselin Petkov (ed.) (Springer 2007, in press); arXiv:gr-qc/0703098v1; (Dynamics, Philosophy)
M. Varadarajan, D.P. Rideout; A general solution for classical sequential growth dynamics of Causal Sets''; Phys. Rev. D 73 (2006) 104021; arXiv:gr-qc/0504066v3; (Cosmology, Dynamics)
 ;(Dynamics, Poset)

External links 
 The causal set approach to quantum gravity a review article by Joe Henson on causal sets
 Space-time as a causal set - one of the first papers by Luca Bombelli, Joohan Lee, David Meyer, and Rafael D. Sorkin
 Geometry from order: causal sets - non-technical article by Rafael D. Sorkin on Einstein Online

Theoretical physics
Quantum gravity
Order theory